The Kagome crest or  is a star-shaped emblem related to the kagome lattice design (Hexagonal and Octagonal lattices). The Kagome mon can be depicted as, either, a six-pointed star (a hexagram) and as an eight-pointed star (an octagram):  
 The six-pointed star version (a hexagram) is composed of two interlocking equilateral triangles, similar to/interchangeable with the Hindu Shatkona (Sanskrit: षट्कोण, Ṣaṭkoṇa, lit. Six-Sided), which represents the union between opposites, similar to Yin and yang.
 The eight-pointed star version (an octagram) is composed of two interlocking squares, similar to/interchangeable with the Hindu Star of Lakshmi (which represents the Ashtalakshmi (Sanskrit: अष्टलक्ष्मी, Aṣṭalakṣmi, lit. Eightfold Lakshmi), the eight forms, or "kinds of wealth", that the goddess, Lakshmi, represents).  

Regardless of which one, both the six-pointed star and the eight-pointed star are also known as kagome. It can be found in many of the oldest Shinto shrines, and is present on almost all the stone lanterns approaching the Ise-jingu. Its presence in Shinto shrines is believed to ward-away evil, an Apotropaic mark. This symbol is also synonymous with the Cintamani, a "wish-fulfilling stone"(a Mani Jewel), all being icons associated with the goddess, Lakshmi/Kisshōten.  

In regards to heraldry, the Kagome crest is also often associated with the Hata clan.

Amulets
Buddhist symbols
Eastern esotericism
Exorcism in Shinto
Heraldic charges
Japanese culture
Japanese heraldry
Lucky symbols
Magic symbols
Objects believed to protect from evil
Religious symbols
Seals (insignia)
Shinto in Japan
Star symbols
Talismans

ja:籠目